Toast of… is a British television sitcom, known either as Toast of London (when it was set in London) or Toast of Tinseltown (with episodes set in America). It was created by Arthur Mathews and Matt Berry and stars Berry as Steven Toast, an eccentric, middle-aged actor with a chequered past who spends more time dealing with his problems off stage than performing on it.

Production

All episodes are directed by Michael Cumming.

Three series, under the title Toast of London, were broadcast on Channel 4. Series 2 and 3 were shot at the West London Film Studios. In the United States, Toast of London was available on IFC.

In November 2017, after reports of a fourth series, Berry clarified that it will return "in some form at some point", but nothing was currently being written. Mathews later said that they have an idea for "Toast in America", but that no deadline was set. In December 2017, Channel 4 officially renewed the show for another series.

During the COVID-19 pandemic, a new YouTube channel with new audio skits of Toast of London was created, whilst in 2021 the "Toast in America" series was confirmed as a six-part television project for the BBC, under the title Toast of Tinseltown. The series debuted on BBC Two on 4 January 2022 with all episodes of Toast of Tinseltown uploaded to the BBC iPlayer at the same time, alongside the three series of Toast of London.

Cast and characters

Main
 Matt Berry as Steven Gonville Toast, the central character of the series. A bumbling, single, self-important actor who unsuccessfully attempts to become a ladies' man and often the bearer of bad fortune. Toast considers himself a success despite his obviously failing career.
 Berry also portrays a younger version of Steven's father, Colonel Gonville Toast, in the series 3 episode "Beauty Calls".
 Doon Mackichan as Jane Plough (which she pronounces "pluff" ) like "Clough", Toast's unhelpful agent. Prim and posh, she sees herself as superior to Toast, despite her failure to provide him with decent work. She was played by Fiona Mollison in the pilot.
 Mackichan also plays Brooke Hooberman, Toast's US agent in Toast of Tinseltown.
 Robert Bathurst as Ed Howzer-Black, Toast's landlord and an idle retired actor.
 Bathurst also portrays Ed's father, Rupert Howzer-Black, in the series 3 episode "Beauty Calls".
 Harry Peacock as Ray "Bloody" Purchase, Toast's fellow actor and rival, and a virulent homophobe. The two hate each other with a vengeance and are constantly in competition. While Purchase often seems to have the upper hand, Toast is still sometimes able to come out on top. 
 Peacock also portrays Ray's albino twin brother, Bill Purchase, in the series 3 episode "Man of Sex".
 Tim Downie as Danny Bear, a studio sound engineer and stereotypical hipster who regularly hires Toast for voiceover work in a London studio.
 Shazad Latif as Clem Fandango, another hipster who is doing work experience in the recording studio. Clem routinely says to Toast "Hello, Steven? This is Clem Fandango. Can you hear me?" to which Toast is forced to reply with some variation of "Yes. I can hear you, Clem Fandango."
 Tracy-Ann Oberman as Mrs Purchase, the wife of Ray Purchase and a prostitute who is enjoying an affair with Toast. Despite being a prostitute, the only person she ever charges for sex is her husband.

In Toast of Tinseltown, additional main characters include:
 Fred Armisen as Russ Nightlife/D. B. Cooper, Toast's eccentric and reclusive roommate in Los Angeles.
 Rashida Jones as Billy/Milly Tarzana, Nightlife's housekeeper.

Recurring
 Adrian Lukis as Colonel Blair Toast, Steven's eccentric older brother. An army veteran, he lost his hand in the Falklands War and now uses a stuffed rubber glove as a replacement.
Amanda Donohoe as Ellen, Toast's abusive and volatile ex-wife. Despite her poor treatment of him, Toast continues to have feelings for her.
Alan Ford as Alan, who is a hypnotist and a homeopath. Ford also appears as a taxi driver called "Mick Carriage"
Peter Davison plays a fictionalised version of himself.
Morgana Robinson makes one appearance in each of the four series, each time as a different character. She portrays Jemima Gina in "Addictive Personality", Lorna Wynde in "Fool in Love", Emma in "Beauty Calls" and Wildcat Lil in "Death Valley".
Geoffrey McGivern appears as three separate one-off characters, all of whom were temperamental directors working with Toast. He portrays Cliff Promise in "The Unspeakable Play", Acker Herron in "Afternoon Tea", and Norris Flipjack in "Desperate Measures".

Guest
Aidan Turner as Barney
Anthony Atamanuik as Donald Trump
Bob Mortimer as himself
Benedict Wong as Rusty Halloween
Bill Hader as Dwight Difference
Brian Blessed as Col. Gonville Toast
Carol Cleveland as First Brooke Hooberman
Guy Combes as Daniel Day-Lewis
Colin MacFarlane as Weech Beacon
Daisy Ridley as Stagehand
David Arnold as Club Pianist
Freddie Fox as Edward Fox
James Lance as	Martin Aynuss
Jamie Demetriou as Troy
John Nettles as himself
John Simm as himself
Jon Hamm as Hamm
Josh Homme as himself
Jude Law as himself
Larry David as Sola Mirronek
Lewis MacLeod as Dr. Who/Announcer/Stanley Kubrick/Orson Welles
Lindsay Duncan as herself
Lorraine Kelly as herself
Louise Jameson as Wendy Nook
Martin Freeman as himself
Matthew Holness as Max Gland
Michael Ball as himself
Natasia Demetriou as Carmen
Pat Shortt as Larry Muggins
Paul Rudd as himself
Paul Whitehouse as Vic Titball
Richard Gibson as Denis Thwaites
Sam Mendes as himself
Simon Cartwright as Bob Monkhouse
Terry Mynott as Boris Johnson/Axel Jacklin
Sheila Hancock as herself
Stanley Townsend as Mr. Fusili
Steve Pemberton as Francis Bacon
Susan Wokoma as Nina Armenian
Tim Pigott-Smith as himself
Vic Reeves as Compere

Episodes

Series overview

Pilot episode (2012)

Series 1 (2013)

Series 2 (2014)

Series 3 (2015)

Series 4: Toast of Tinseltown (2022)

Music and songs
The theme music, "Take My Hand" was composed by Matt Berry and was released on the album Witchazel. Each episode of Toast of London also features a novelty song sung by Berry's character Toast, and others. The songs are sometimes sung partly to the fourth wall.

Toast of Tinseltown employed a new end theme, a cover version of Swedish pop singer Doris' "Beatmaker" performed by Matt Berry and Emma Noble.

Reception

Awards
At the 61st Rose d'Or awards in 2022, Toast of Tinseltown was named as the best comedy.

Book
In 2015, Matt Berry and Arthur Mathews published Toast on Toast: Cautionary tales and candid advice, a spoof autobiography of Steven Toast. It was also released as an audio book read by Matt Berry.

References

External links 

Toast of London (2012) at the British Film Institute

2012 British television series debuts
2010s British sitcoms
2010s British workplace comedy television series
2020s British sitcoms
2020s British workplace comedy television series
Adultery in television
BBC television sitcoms
British television series revived after cancellation
Channel 4 sitcoms
English-language television shows
Single-camera television sitcoms
Television series about actors
Television series by All3Media
Television shows set in London
Television shows set in Los Angeles